Pyatthat (from Sanskrit ;  ; also spelt pyathat) is the name of a multistaged roof, with an odd number of tiers (from three to seven). The pyatthat is commonly incorporated into Burmese Buddhist and royal architecture (e.g., kyaungs, palace buildings, pagodas) and towers above the image of the Buddha or other sacred places (e.g., royal thrones and city gates).

Construction
The pyatthat is made of successive gabled rectangular roofs in an exaggerated pyramidal shape, with an intervening box-like structure called the lebaw between each roof. The pyatthat is crowned with a wooden spire called the taing bu or kun bu depending on its shape, similar to the hti, an umbrella ornament that crowns Burmese pagodas. The edges of each tier are gold-gilded decorative designs made of metal sheet, with decorative ornaments called du yin at the corners (analogous to the Thai chofah). There are three primary kinds of pyatthat, with the variation being the number of tiers called boun (from Pali bhumi). Three-tiered, five-tiered and seven-tiered roofs are called yahma, thooba, and thooyahma, respectively.

History

The usage of the pyatthat began early in Burmese architecture, with examples dating to the Pagan period. Prominent examples from this era that feature the pyatthat include the Ananda Temple and Gawdawpalin Temple.

In pre-colonial Burma, the pyatthat was a prominent feature in the royal buildings, which itself symbolized Tavatimsa, a Buddhist heaven. Above the main throne in the king's primary audience hall was a nine-tiered pyatthat, with the tip representing Mount Meru and the lower six tiers representing the six abodes of the devas and of humans. Furthermore, the 12 city gates of Burmese royal capitals were crowned with pyatthats, with the main ones used by royalty possessing five tiers, and the others possessing five tiers.

In pre-colonial Burma, sumptuary laws restricted the usage of pyatthats to royal and religious buildings, and regulated the number of tiers appertaining to each grade of official rank, The nine-tiered pyatthat was reserved solely for the kingdom's sovereign, while the sawbwas of important tributary states were entitled to seven-tiered pyatthats.

Gallery

References

See also

Prasat (Thai architecture)
Prang (architecture)
Meru tower
Kyaung

Roofs
Burmese Buddhist architecture